Shunde railway station is an elevated station of Guangzhou-Zhuhai Intercity Railway. The station is located at the east of Bigui Lu and the west of Longzhou Lu across Sanchongzhou Channel in Daliang, Shunde District, Foshan, Guangdong, China, which is the center of Shunde District. It started operations on 7 January 2011.

References

Shunde District
Railway stations in China opened in 2011